Fletcher Lewis (born 16 July 1955) is a Bahamian former long jumper who competed in the 1976 Summer Olympics.

References

1949 births
Living people
Bahamian male long jumpers
Olympic athletes of the Bahamas
Athletes (track and field) at the 1975 Pan American Games
Athletes (track and field) at the 1976 Summer Olympics
Florida Gators men's track and field athletes
Pan American Games competitors for the Bahamas